There have been two baronetcies created for persons with the surname Dewar, both in the Baronetage of the United Kingdom. The first was created in 1907, for John Alexander Dewar, and the other in 1917 for his son Thomas Robert Dewar. Both were later elevated to the peerage, as Baron Forteviot and Baron Dewar, respectively.

See also
Baron Forteviot
Baron Dewar

Notes

Baronetcies in the Baronetage of the United Kingdom
Extinct baronetcies in the Baronetage of the United Kingdom